Manorama Dobriyal Sharma was an Indian politician of the Indian National Congress party. She represented the Uttarakhand constituency from 26 November 2014 – 18 February 2015, when she died, aged 59.

Positions held

Reactions on her Death
 "We all are shattered and yet to come to terms with her death," Sharma's eldest son, Vivek, said.
 Lauding Sharma for her leadership skills, Congress state chief Kishore Upadhyaya said, "We have been working under her leadership since the past few decades and have never heard her speaking loudly to anyone. Her soothing voice and gentle manner were her biggest strength, and these won her respect not only from party workers but even opposition members."
 Congress spokesman Surendra Kumar termed Sharma's death as a major loss for the ruling party. "She was one of the finest persons one can ever come across. A dedicated party worker for over four decades, she was willing to help everyone round the clock,"

References

External links
 http://indianexpress.com/article/india/politics/uttarakhand-manorama-dobriyal-declared-as-congress-nominee-for-rajya-sabha-seat/
 http://www.thehindu.com/news/national/other-states/congress-mp-manorama-sharma-passes-away/article6909329.ece
 http://timesofindia.indiatimes.com/city/dehradun/Cong-RS-MP-Manorama-Sharma-passes-away-at-59/articleshow/46291601.cms
 http://164.100.47.5/newmembers/Website/Main.aspx

1955 births
2015 deaths
Rajya Sabha members from Uttarakhand
Politicians from Dehradun
Indian National Congress politicians from Uttarakhand
21st-century Indian women politicians
21st-century Indian politicians
Women members of the Rajya Sabha
Mayors of Dehradun
Women mayors of places in Uttarakhand